The Flanders Institute for Logistics (VIL) is a Flemish non-profit organization, founded in 2003 by the Flemish government. The VIL supports and enhances the competitiveness of the logistics sector in Flanders.

See also
 Agoria
 Walloon Transport & Logistics Cluster
 Brussels Airport
 Enterprise resource planning (ERP)
 Logistic engineering
 Port of Antwerp
 Supply chain management
 Transport in Belgium
 Institute of Transport and Maritime Management Antwerp
 Science and technology in Flanders

External links
 Flanders Institute for Logistics (VIL)

Non-profit organisations based in Belgium
Science and technology in Belgium
Flanders